The Women's 10 metre platform diving competition at the 2015 Summer Universiade in Gwangju was held on 5 July at the Nambu University International Aquatics Center.

Schedule
All times are Korea Standard Time (UTC+09:00)

Results

References 

Results

External links
 Official website

Diving at the 2015 Summer Universiade